The Museum of Black Joy is a virtual museum launched by Philadelphia artist Andrea "Philly" Walls in January 2020. The museum's mission statement says that it exists "To celebrate, cultivate, commemorate, & circulate stories that center Black joy". The museum includes photography, videos, poems, and other visuals meant to celebrate the African-American experience. The museum's homepage includes phrases such as "I see you. You are beautiful," as well as a quote from two-time Pulitzer Prize-nominated poet Lucille Clifton. It is described on its website as "A Borderless Refuge for the observation, cultivation, celebration and preservation of Black Joy."

Background

Museum
The Museum is accessible through a webpage format that involves video, audio, photographic and artistic components. The Museum follows a black and white, greyscale theme throughout the webpage. Through a drop-down menu at the top right, the visitor is able to access the different facets of the museum. This includes the homepage, the Black Joy Symposium, Exhibitions, Featured Artists, the About page, the Global Joy Archive, and the Contact page.

The "About" drop-down list features a subpage, "The Museum," that highlights the Museum's mission, vision, and summary statement. The Museum of Black Joy, as defined by Walls, is a living document that highlights everyday and impactful interactions of Black life as an "interactive archive" and a "hybrid exhibition space." With Philadelphia as inspiration and a muse, this Museum demonstrates Black joy through the intersection of storytelling and technology. The About The Museum page features a visual expression. To the audio of "Lift Every Voice and Sing", Walls features a looping video that pans across a playground of young children partaking in multiple activities. The piece is titled, "Election Day", taken on November 7, 2020, and notes Granahan Playground as the location.

The header of the website, included on every page, features the title of the Museum, "The Museum of Black Joy" that takes the visitor back to the homepage. The header also features the slogan, "I see you. You are Beautiful." The footer features a continuous line drawing of two women above soil with text in between them that reads, "weeping may tarry for the night, but joy comes in the morning." This text is the bible verse, Psalms 30: 5, quoted from the American Standard version of the Holy Bible. The footer also includes a hyperlinked black and white graphic that reads, " This space is created, curated, and cared for by Andrea 'Philly' Walls" and carries the visitor to the About Founder page when clicked on.

Walls opted for a virtual museum as opposed to an in-person experience to make her art more accessible. She stated that not everyone can visit an in-person museum for various personal reasons and didn't want anyone to miss out on experiencing her art. This digital museum began as a blog run by Walls in January 2020 where she would upload photographs of scenes from Philadelphia daily. When the COVID-19 pandemic hit, she was unable to continue photographing as frequently as she used to, but continued working on what would become the digital museum. Walls choose Black joy as the focus for the digital museum to counteract the how the Black experience is portrayed in the media. She told The Philadelphia Inquirer that she "was really looking for a way to make art that doesn’t ignore" the "live-action murders" Black individuals face but wanted to do so without "a very traumatizing visual narrative". Walls describes Black joy as "a very particular and specific salvation. It’s for me about endurance, possibility, creativity, grace, and a supreme kindness."  

Since Walls and the museum were featured in The Philadelphia Inquirer on July 25, 2021, traffic to the site increased "almost 2000%" according to an interview she did with NPR.

Creator/curator

Early life and career
Andrea Walls is a 57-year-old poet, photographer, and Philadelphia native. Before creating the digital experience, she was a Pushcart Prize-nominated poet. After studying photography for 2 years, she began blogging photos of everyday activities concerning African-Americans outside her house in West Philadelphia. Walls grew up in Cobbs Creek, West Philadelphia, and many of her first blogged photographs were of images that evoked memories of her own childhood, such as kids playing in the streets, adults socializing in a park, and patrons at restaurants. More than 40% of Philadelphia's population is African-American, giving Walls great exposure to Black culture. Philadelphia is also the location of the African American Museum in Philadelphia, which opened in 1976 as the first city-funded institution in America to showcase the life of African-Americans. Walls hoped to be able to document Black life before the effects of gentrification disallowed her from doing so. In the past, she has worked with organizations such as the Writers Room at Drexel University and the Studio Museum of Harlem. Her work has been supported by organizations such as the Colored Girls Museum, the Studio Museum of Harlem, the Women's Mobile Museum, the Eastern State Penitentiary, and Mural Arts Philadelphia.

In October 2021, Walls was chosen as the recipient of the MIT & Black Public Media Visiting Arts Program hosted by MIT's OpenDocLab. As an OpenDocLab fellow, Walls will present a final project in April 2022 at the PitchBLACK event. Walls and alternate recipient Ngardy Conteh George have received $7,500 in funding for their projects and to participate in the fellowship.

2020: COVID-19 and racial reckoning

The onset of the COVID-19 pandemic, and the subsequent stay-at-home orders, meant that her ability to photograph everyday activities was hindered. In 2020, the United States would experience not only more than 345,000 deaths due to COVID-19, but also confronted highly publicized instances of police brutality against African-Americans, such as the murder of George Floyd. Philadelphia has experienced over 189,000 cases of COVID-19, with over 4,000 deaths from the illness. The first case in the city was reported on March 10, a stay-at-home order was issued for the city on March 22, and by April cases had started to decrease, despite speculation that the city would become the country's next hot spot. Soon after the murder of George Floyd, the city saw widespread protests and civil unrest break out on May 30, with Mayor Kenney instituting a curfew later that day. Thirteen police officers sustained injuries and more than 200 people were brought into police custody on the first day of protests, and on June 6 more than 50,000 people joined in protests in front of the Philadelphia Museum of Art. Overall, the protests were some of the largest in the country, and they provided ample photography opportunities for Walls to incorporate into her museum. Hoping to counter the pain and sadness experienced by many in the Black community, Walls created the museum to be a source of healing and happiness, describing the digital experience as "counter-programming".

 

Inspirations

Walls has listed artists from the Harlem Renaissance and Black Arts Movements as among those who have inspired her work. Prominent artists from these eras include Langston Hughes and Claude McKay from the Harlem Renaissance, and Gwendolyn Brooks and Maya Angelou from the Black Arts Movement. These artists found a way to blend their storytelling and narratives with social critiques and activism, much like what Walls does through her photography.

Under the about tab of the museum's website, Walls also names several other joy workers, artists, and activists that inspired her. One such inspiration is the "Black Joy Project," a multimedia culmination of Black joy moments curated by artist Kleaver Cruz. Walls also names a photography book titled Black Joy and Resistance by Arienne Waheed as well as Dr. Bettina Love's book, We Want to do More Than Just Survive: Abolitionist Teaching and the Pursuit of Educational Freedom as other key influences. The last inspiration named on the page is an art initiative called "Women's Mobile Museum" led by activist Zanele Muholi. The project includes the work of 10 female artists visually documenting their "journey to reclaim the space and function of creating art" with the help of filmmakers.

Exhibits and artwork
As of December 2, 2021, the Museum of Black Joy features two installations – "Joy Ride" and the exhibition "Dimensions of Joy: A Digital Installation”.

Exhibition: Joy Ride
"Joy Ride" is located on the homepage of Museum of Black Joy website and features 9 original works of photography by Andrea Walls titled "In Hand", "Couples Skate", "Ramona", "Skyways", "In the Stacks", "The View From Up Here", "Embraced", "The Shakes", and "Flip". Each photograph is in black-and-white. Above the series of photographs, the quote "come celebrate with me that everyday something has tried to kill me and has failed" by Lucille Clifton.  

Joy Ride also features a digital slideshow of additional photographs from Philadelphia with the recommended soundtrack "Oh What a Beautiful City!" by Marian Anderson. Viewing is recommended on a desktop of laptop. There are 15 black-and-white photographs included in the slideshow. Their titles are not featured.

Exhibition: Dimensions of Joy
Dimensions of Joy is a digital exhibition that features eight installations created and curated by Andrea Walls. The installations featured are either animated collages, video quilts, or video collages that span through the years 2016 to 2021, presented in a non-chronological order. Each installation features an audio compliment, a variation of music or poetry, from multiple artists. Walls links applicable biographies of artists with their respective audio features . All installations are accessible through the "Exhibitions" tab in the drop-down menu on the website, and can be accessed in any order. But in contrast, the viewer is prompted to progress chronologically from one dimension to the next at the bottom of each installation.

Featured artists
After the section titled "Exhibitions" on the drop-down menu on the museum's website is the Featured Artists section.* As of December 2, 2021, there are 5 featured artists: Ken McFarlane, Charlyn Magdalene Griffith Oro, Wit López, Mz. ICAR, and muthi reed. Each artist has a brief biography and images of their work featured.

Ken McFarlane is a documentary and portrait photographer based in West Philadelphia. His work focuses on "Black triumph" and his current work is described as "focus[ing] on producing visual and audio histories of Philadelphians in the present". This work aims to "preserve collective memory" and allow future generations to examine their personal abilities and "potential". Featured are images of photographs taken by McFarlane and links to his social media account, his website, and a PBS article written about him.

Charlyn Magdalene Giffith Oro is self-described as a "Socially Engaged Interdisciplinary Artist". Their work focuses on ancestral communications with progeny. Their work aims to increase Black and Indigenous "memory & imagination".* Featured is an image of their work, links to their social media accounts, and their website.

Wit López is a Philadelphia-based artist who works with photography, painting, collage, and fiber art. López is also trained in theatre performance which is represented throughout their work. López was born in Brooklyn, New York, and is disabled and gender non-conforming/nonbinary transgender. Featured is an image of their piece "Tryna Keep A Straight Face" which is a digital quilt released in 2021. There are also links to their social media, their website, and a link to an image description of their piece.

Mz. ICAR is an anonymous artist. "Mz. ICAR" is the word "racism" in reverse. She is an interdisciplinary artist using mixed-media, textile, murals, and photography. Her work mainly focuses on women, the future for people of color, "Global Blackness" and "Play". Featured is a headshot of Mz. ICAR with her face obscured by her hair. Included is a link to her website and to the website of her public-art exhibition "Roadmap to Joy".

muthi reed is a video and sound mixer who uses an "embodied Black Queer practice" within their work. Featured is a slideshow of components of their work, a link to an article they've written titled "Old Black Businesses", a ‘zine titled "Hollerin’ Space Root Zine", and a link to a website featuring "House Of Lux" which is defined as "a public walk with Black 'metropolarity' archive patterns of emergence."

Public reception
Since its creation, both the museum and Walls have been featured in several journalism websites and social media accounts online.

Interviews
 Philadelphia Inquirer: On July 25, 2021, the Inquirer published an interview with Walls detailing her reasoning behind creating the museum as well as featuring several of her photography pieces such as 'Learning the Ropes: A Rite of Passage' and 'On the Good Foot: Or Pulling Ourselves up by Our Pom Poms.'
 FOX 29 Philadelphia: On August 1, 2021, FOX 29 news conducted a live interview with Walls showcasing several images and digital art pieces from the museum.
 BNC News: In a YouTube interview with Marc Lamont Hill from BNC News on August 6, 2021, Andrea Walls discussed the inspirations behind the museum and how she curated each of the pieces showcased on the website. In the interview, Hill describes the museum as a "choice to look for magnificence in the everyday."
 NPR: On August 14, 2021, NPR interviewed Walls and featured her pieces, 'Election Day at Granahan Playground & Skate Park,' 'Ramona! A Celebration of Life,' 'Ready, Set, Prance,' and 'Quench' in their article.

Other articles
 Walls and the Museum of Black Joy were also featured in Because of Them We Can, Technically, and Black Enterprise from August to November 2021. On August 24, 2021, Black Enterprise called the museum a "healing and powerful perspective of the Black experience" and wrote that "during the dark days of the pandemic and the constant images and stories of racial injustice, The Museum of Black Joy became a source of healing."

Social media
 Several posts about the museum are also featured under the hashtag: #MuseumofBlackJoy on Twitter. Additionally, links to articles about the museum have been shared by Twitter users such as journalism Professor Sonora Jha and lecturer Dr. Joy DeGruy as of December 2, 2021. DeGruy expresses that the museum is necessary to "commemorate Black joy so that generations to come remember not just the Black struggle, but Black joy as well."

References

2000 establishments in Pennsylvania
Art museums established in 2000
Internet properties established in 2000
Virtual art museums and galleries
Art museums and galleries in Philadelphia
African-American art
Wikipedia Student Program